Oberaarsee is a hydroelectric reservoir in the Grimsel area, part of the municipality of Guttannen,  Switzerland. The Oberaar dam was completed in 1953, and is operated by Kraftwerke Oberhasli. It is drained by the Oberaarbach, which flows into the Grimselsee.

The Oberaar glacier is located west of the lake.

See also
List of lakes of Switzerland
List of mountain lakes of Switzerland

References

External links

Lake Oberaar

Bernese Oberland
Oberhasli
Reservoirs in Switzerland
LOberaarsee
Lakes of the canton of Bern